Jake Thomas (born December 6, 1990) is a professional Canadian football defensive tackle for the Winnipeg Blue Bombers of the Canadian Football League (CFL).

University career
Thomas played CIS football for the Acadia Axemen.

Professional career
Thomas was drafted 29th overall in the fourth round of the 2012 CFL Draft by the Winnipeg Blue Bombers and signed with the team on May 11, 2012. He played in his first game on June 29, 2012 against the BC Lions where he also recorded his first defensive tackle. He played in 14 regular season games in a backup role as a rookie. In 2013, Thomas continued to develop in a backup role and recorded his first career quarterback sack against the Hamilton Tiger-Cats on November 2, 2013 after tackling Dan LeFevour for a two-yard loss. While his primary role is playing on the defensive line, the Blue Bombers have also used Thomas on the offensive line, either due to injuries or in short yardage situations. He recorded his first career interception against the BC Lions on July 21, 2017 when he picked off Travis Lulay and lateralled the ball to teammate Kyle Knox who then returned it for a touchdown.

Thomas was the longest serving member of the Blue Bombers team that beat both the Calgary Stampeders and Saskatchewan Roughriders during the 2019 CFL Playoffs, en route to the 107th Grey Cup game. As the longest serving player at the time, Thomas was the first member of the Blue Bomber team to raise the Grey Cup on stage during the team's celebration. He signed a one-year contract extension with the team on January 4, 2021. After another strong season in 2021, and another Grey Cup victory, Thomas re-signed with the Blue Bombers on January 5, 2022, returning for his tenth season in Winnipeg. On December 12, 2022 Thomas and the Bombers agreed to another contract extension.

Statistics

References

External links
Winnipeg Blue Bombers bio

1990 births
Living people
Canadian football defensive linemen
People from York County, New Brunswick
Players of Canadian football from New Brunswick
Acadia Axemen football players
Winnipeg Blue Bombers players